Little Wormwood Scrubs is a park in Kensal Green on the border of Hammersmith and Fulham and Royal Borough of Kensington and Chelsea.
Counter's Creek, a now subterranean stream that arises in Kensal Green flows south through the park, eventually joining the River Thames.

History
Little Wormwood Scrubs was originally part of Wormwood Scrubs, and separated from it in the 1840s when the railway embankment of the West London line was built.

In 1870, the northwest part of the land was exchanged for land to the south east;

Little Wormwood Scrubs today
In 2005, an unexploded terrorist bomb was discovered in the park. Part of the 21 July 2005 London bombings, it was made safe by the police using a controlled explosion.

See also
North Pole depot, railway depot to the north of both Wormwood Scrubs, and Little Wormwood Scrubs
Nearby places
 White City, London
 Kensal Green
 North Kensington

References

Parks and open spaces in the London Borough of Hammersmith and Fulham
Common land in London